Oliver Luksic (born 9 October 1979) is a German politician of the Free Democratic Party (FDP) who has been a Member of the Bundestag for Saarland since the 2017 elections, after having previously served from 2009 until 2013.

In addition to his parliamentary work, Luksic has been serving as Parliamentary State Secretary in the Federal Ministry of Transport and Digital Infrastructure in the coalition government of Chancellor Olaf Scholz since 2021. In this capacity, he is the Federal Government’s Coordinator for Freight and Logistics.

Early life and education
Luksic was educated at Sciences Po and King's College London.

Political career
Luksic served as Member of the German Bundestag between the 2002 and the 2013 national elections. In this capacity, he was a member of the Committee on European Affairs and of the Committee on Transport, Building and Urban Development. In 2012, he succeeded Patrick Döring as the FDP parliamentary group's spokesperson on transport policy.

In addition to his committee assignments, Luksic served as chairman of the German Parliamentary Friendship Group with Belgium and Luxembourg.

Since 2011, Luksic has been the chairman of the FDP in Saarland. In this capacity, he led the party's campaigns for the Saarland state elections in 2012 and 2017, both times without winning any seats in the state parliament.

In 2014, Luksic took on a position with Merzig-based Kohlpharma, one of the leading importers of pharmaceuticals in Europe.

Lusksic was re-elected as Member of the German Parliament in the 2017 national elections. From 2018 until 2021, he served on the Committee on Transport, Building and Digital Infrastructure. In addition to his committee assignments, he chaired the Parliamentary Friendship Group for Relations with Croatia and Slovenia. From 2019, he was a member of the German delegation to the Franco-German Parliamentary Assembly.

In the negotiations to form a so-called traffic light coalition of the Social Democrats (SPD), the Green Party and the FDP following the 2021 federal elections, Luksic led his party's delegation in the working group on mobility; his co-chairs from the other parties were Anke Rehlinger and Anton Hofreiter.

Other activities

Corporate boards
 Autobahn GmbH, Chair of the Supervisory Board (since 2022)

Non-profit organizations
 Baker Tilly Foundation, Member of the Advisory Board
 Belgian-German Society, President (2010–2013)
 European Movement Germany, Member of the Board (since 2009)

Personal life
Luksic lives with his family in Heusweiler.

References 

1979 births
Living people
Sciences Po alumni
Alumni of King's College London
Members of the Bundestag for Saarland
Members of the Bundestag 2017–2021
Members of the Bundestag 2021–2025
Members of the Bundestag for the Free Democratic Party (Germany)